These Final Hours is a 2013 Australian sci-fi apocalyptic thriller film written and directed by Zak Hilditch and starring Nathan Phillips and Angourie Rice. It was selected to be screened as part of the Directors' Fortnight section of the 2014 Cannes Film Festival.

Plot
The film takes place in Perth and begins ten minutes after an asteroid has collided with earth in the North Atlantic, leaving approximately twelve hours until the subsequent global firestorm reaches Western Australia. James and his lover, Zoe, are having sex for the last time at her beach house, where she reveals that she is pregnant with James' child. Wishing to block out all feelings and avoid what's coming, James berates Zoe for sharing her news and leaves for "the party to end all parties".

After having his car stolen, he comes across two men who have kidnapped a young girl and are planning to rape her. James kills them and rescues the girl. The girl, named Rose, explains that she was separated from her father in Malaga en route to her aunt's house in Roleystone. Without enough petrol and wishing to get to his party, James instead plans to leave her with his sister and her children. But upon arriving, he finds his sister and her husband dead in the shower and three crosses marking what appear to be his nieces' graves in what is an apparent murder suicide.

Other attempts at locating Rose's dad or someone to leave her with have sobering results, and James eventually heads to the party with Rose in tow. The party is overflowing with people, a game of Russian roulette is being played, and an orgy is going on inside the house. Rose is noticeably uncomfortable and appears to want to leave. James meets with the host of the party, Freddy, whose sister is James' girlfriend, Vicki. James leaves Rose in the pool to speak with Vicki. In a reversal of the earlier scene with Zoe, James attempts to share a serious moment with Vicki, only for her to berate him for bringing her down with his news.

Vicki shows James a bunker built underneath Freddy's garage, which obviously does not have sufficient food, protection, or space for the miraculous survival Vicki envisions. James tells Vicki and Freddy that they will all die, even with the bunker. Freddy's reaction to this statement informs Vicki that her brother had known this all along. James accepts that his death is inevitable and cannot be blocked out, and commits himself to reuniting Rose with her family.

Meanwhile, outside, a drug-affected woman follows Rose, claiming that she is her daughter, Mandy. When James finally comes back outside to find Rose, she is hallucinating and vomiting after being coerced into taking an ecstasy pill, with the woman leaning over her. James tries to leave the party with Rose, causing the woman to scream that he is kidnapping her child. Freddy holds James at gunpoint, before Vicki calmly takes the gun and shoots the woman, telling James to go.

James drives Rose to his estranged mother's house, with whom he reconciles while Rose recovers. She gives James petrol and Rose some old clothes, and the pair leave for Rose's aunt's house. Upon arrival, nobody seems to be home, but James finds the bodies of Rose's family, including her father, outside in what seems to be a mass suicide. Although hysterical at the news of her father's death, Rose insists on seeing him. James comforts her and brings her his body, and they lay him by a pond with flowers as she tells him that her dad wanted them to be together for the end. James then confides in Rose about his relationship with Zoe and her pregnancy, which leads him to realise his love for her. Rose convinces him to make amends with her while he still can. He heeds her advice, and the two share an emotional farewell before James leaves. His car overheats on the highway as the firestorm approaches, and he runs the rest of the way. He finds Zoe on the beach, watching the approaching firestorm. She is initially hostile towards James, but the two quickly reconcile and confess their mutual love. The pair then embrace, and turn towards the ocean as they are consumed by the firestorm.

Cast

 Nathan Phillips as James
 Angourie Rice as Rose
 Jessica De Gouw as Zoe
 Kathryn Beck as Vicki
 Daniel Henshall as Freddy
 Sarah Snook as Mandy's mother
 Lynette Curran as James' mother
 David Field as Radio Man

Reception

Box office
These Final Hours opened in a limited release across Australia, grossing $360,234 throughout its entire theatrical run.

Critical reception
Rotten Tomatoes, a review aggregator, reports that 83% of 52 surveyed critics gave the film a positive review; the average rating is 7.03/10. The critical consensus states: "Writer-director Zak Hilditch's thought-provoking screenplay -- and a stellar performance from young Angourie Rice -- make These Final Hours worth watching, even if its end-of-the-world premise is overly familiar."  Metacritic rated the film 61 out of 100 based on 9 critics, indicating "generally favorable reviews".

Possible remake
In 2015, it was announced that EuropaCorp was planning an American remake, in which Hilditch would return to write, direct, and produce, however, there are no more updates or news about the film after it was confirmed.

References

External links
 
 
 

2013 films
2013 drama films
2013 thriller drama films
Australian thriller drama films
Australian science fiction films
Films set in Western Australia
Films shot in Perth, Western Australia
Films about impact events
2010s English-language films
Films set in bunkers